Corning is a hamlet in the Canadian province of Saskatchewan.

Geography 
Corning is in the RM of Golden West and is located along Highway 711, about four kilometres east of Highway 47.

Demographics 

See also
List of communities in Saskatchewan

References

External links

Designated places in Saskatchewan
Golden West No. 95, Saskatchewan
Organized hamlets in Saskatchewan
Division No. 1, Saskatchewan